Everything I Am may refer to:
 "Everything I Am", a 1967 song by Plastic Penny
 "Everything I Am" (song), a 2000 song by Anna Vissi
 Everything I Am (album), a 2000 album by Anna Vissi
 Everything I Am, a 2003 album by Ann Winsborn
 "Everything I Am" (Kanye West song), 2007
"Everything I Am" (song) a 2020 song by Clayton John Pearson